HMS Orestes  was a wooden screw corvette launched from Sheerness dockyard in 1860 for the Royal Navy. She was commissioned in 1861 and served on the Cape of Good Hope station until 1865. She was broken up in Portsmouth in November 1866.

References

 

Jason-class corvettes
Ships built in Sheerness
1860 ships